John Eggart "Jack" Mortland (born January 23, 1935) is an American racewalker. He competed in the men's 20 kilometres walk at the 1964 Summer Olympics.

References

1935 births
Living people
Athletes (track and field) at the 1964 Summer Olympics
American male racewalkers
Olympic track and field athletes of the United States
Place of birth missing (living people)